Rock 'n' Roll Highschool is the third studio album by Teddybears STHLM. It was released in 2000 by MVG. This marks the band's transition from punk rock to electronic music

Track listing
All music & lyrics written by Teddybears STHLM unless otherwise noted.
"Teddybears Live 'n' Direct"
"Rock'n'roll Highschool" (feat. Thomas Rusiak) (lyrics: Thomas Rusiak, Teddybears STHLM)
"Ahead of My Time" (feat. Daddy Boastin')
"Move Over"
"Punkrocker"
"Start at 11" (feat. Eagle-Eye Cherry)
"Skit 1"
"Automatic Lover"
"Tigerman"
"Yours to Keep" (feat. Paola)
"Skit 2"
"Throw Your Hands Up" (feat. Elephant Man & Harry Toddler) (lyrics: Patrick Jackson, O'Neil Bryan, Steven Ventura)
"Digital Cowboy"
Game for PC

Musicians

Teddybears STHLM
 Tiger (Patrik Arve)
 Jocko Apa (Joakim Åhlund)
 Klas Åhlund
 Erik Olsson

Additional musicians
 DJ Viet-Naam - cuts

References
[ Rock 'n' Roll Highschool] at Allmusic

2000 albums
Teddybears (band) albums